Castelo de Tomar is a castle in Portugal, where it is classified as a national monument. The Convento de Cristo was built inside its walls.

The castle was built by King Afonso Henriques around 1160 on a strategic location, over a hill and near river Nabão. It has an outer defensive wall and a citadel (alcáçova) with a keep inside. The keep, a central tower of residential and defensive functions, was introduced in Portugal by the Templars, and the one in Tomar is one of the oldest in the country. Another novelty introduced in Portugal by the Templars (learned from decades of experience in Normandy and Brittany and elsewhere) are the round towers in the outer walls, which are more resistant to attacks than square towers. When the town was founded, most of its residents lived in dwellings located inside the protective outer walls of the castle.

Tomar was besieged for five days during the Almohad campaign of 1190.

References

Tomar
Castle Tomar
Buildings and structures in Tomar
Tomar